Ralph Sheldon Mansfield, 4th Baron Sandhurst, OBE (19 July 1892 – 1964) was the son of John William Mansfield, 3rd Baron Sandhurst. Mansfield became 4th Baron Sandhurst upon the death of his father, John William Mansfield, the 3rd Baron Sandhurst, in 1933.

Biography
He was educated at Winchester College and Trinity College, Cambridge.

Military service
During World War I he served with the Royal Engineers Signal Service, and was made OBE in 1918.  In 1939 he was commissioned as a Major in the Royal Corps of Signals in 1939 and worked for MI8.

Family
He married Morley Victoria Upcher (died 17 June 1961), daughter of Edward Berners Upcher, on 8 February 1917. They had three children:

 Valerie Mansfield (25 December 1918 - 3 August 1994), who in 1938 married George Parker, Viscount Parker
 John Edward Terence Mansfield, 5th Baron Sandhurst (born 4 September 1920)
 Ralph Geoffrey Knyvet Mansfield (born 8 November 1926)

Arms

References

1892 births
1964 deaths
Barons in the Peerage of the United Kingdom
Officers of the Order of the British Empire
Eldest sons of British hereditary barons
British Army personnel of World War I
Royal Engineers soldiers
British Army personnel of World War II
Royal Corps of Signals officers